Saint-Erme station (French: Gare de Saint-Erme)  is a railway station located in the commune of Saint-Erme-Outre-et-Ramecourt, in the department of Aisne, northern France. The station is located close to the commune of Montaigu. It is situated at kilometric point (KP) 34.102 on the Reims-Laon railway. It is served by TER Grand Est trains between Reims and Laon (line C10) operated by the SNCF.

In 2018, the SNCF recording 72,014 passenger movements through the station.

History 
On 31 August 1857, the Compagnie des chemins de fer des Ardennes commenced passenger operations on the 52km Reims-Laon railway, on which the station is situated. Freight services commenced a couple of months later on 15 October 1857.

References 

Railway stations in Aisne
Railway stations in France opened in 1857